Tractor Supply Company (also known as TSCO or TSC), founded in 1938, is an American retail chain of stores that sells products for home improvement, agriculture, lawn and garden maintenance, livestock, equine and pet care for recreational farmers and ranchers, pet owners, and landowners. The company has 2,000 stores and is headquartered in Brentwood, Tennessee. It is publicly traded on the NASDAQ under the ticker symbol TSCO and is a Fortune 500 company.

History

1938–1998 
Charles Schmidt founded Tractor Supply Company in Chicago in 1938 as a mail-order catalog that sold tractor parts to working farms. The first retail store was founded in 1939 in Minot, North Dakota. From 1941 to 1946, the company opened stores in Nebraska, Minnesota and Iowa.

On January 14, 1959, Tractor Supply became publicly traded on the Over-The-Counter Market and reached $10 million in sales. The company was later traded on the New York Stock Exchange.

In 1967, TSC opened its first international stores in Canada. Two years later, Schmidt sold his controlling interest in the company to National Industries. This and other factors, such as changing executive leadership and adding inventory that strayed from its traditional categories, led to a few years of losses for the company.  In 1979, the company moved to Nashville, Tennessee. In 1982, Tractor Supply put ownership of the company back in the hands of executives and returned to their farm-store niche, resulting in a break-even year. The company was incorporated in Delaware that year.

On February 17, 1994, the company went public on the NASDAQ under the ticker symbol TSCO.

1998–2003 
Over time, Tractor Supply expanded to also serve hobbyist farmers, such as families living in the suburbs with an interest in gardening and livestock. In 2002, the company earned $1.21 billion.

2004–2019 
Just two years later, in 2004, the company reported revenues of more than $1.7 billion and Fortune magazine named Tractor Supply to its list of the 100 fastest growing businesses. That year, Tractor Supply moved its headquarters to Brentwood, Tennessee. Jim Wright served as the CEO from 2004 to 2013. He was replaced by Gregory Sandfort.

In 2014, Tractor Supply made it on the Fortune 500 list. On March 31, 2018, the company opened its 1700th store. On September 4, 2018, the company celebrated its 80th anniversary by ringing the closing bell at the NASDAQ Stock Exchange in New York.

2020–present 
TSC's 1,900th store opened in September 2020. By December, the company had 1,923 stores in 49 states. By October 2021, there were 1,967 stores in 49 states. Hal Lawton became CEO in 2020.  That year, the company received a Great Place to Work certification.

During the COVID-19 pandemic, Tractor Supply was deemed an essential business and remained open. The company saw revenue grow 27 percent as more people turned to gardening and pet and livestock ownership. That year, it also established the Tractor Supply Company Foundation.

In 2021, Tractor Supply reached #291 on the Fortune 500 list and had over 20 million members in its loyalty program, Neighbor's Club. TSC is the largest retail ranch and farm store operator in the U.S.

On Oct 11, 2022, Tractor Supply received clearance from the FTC to close on its acquisition of Orscheln Farm & Home. In order to mitigate federal anti-trust concerns, Tractor Supply sold 73 Orscheln stores and the Orscheln distribution center in Moberly, Missouri, to Bomgaars, and 12 stores were sold to Missouri-based farm store chain Buchheit.

Products
Tractor Supply carries between 15,500 and 20,000 products in store, including work and recreational clothing, lawn and garden tools, home goods, fencing, truck beds, chicken coops, pet food, and feed for farm animals. Around 15 percent of in-store products are unique to the store's region. Online, the company offers thirteen product categories and sells between 125,000 and 150,000 products.

In 2020, the livestock and pet products category accounted for 47 percent of the company's sales. Two categories tied for second-highest sales with 21 percent each: hardware, tools, truck and towing products; and seasonal products such as lawn and garden equipment, gifts, and toys. They were followed by clothing and footwear with 7 percent and agricultural products with 4 percent of sales. Tractor Supply's exclusive brands represented 29 percent of their total sales in 2021.

Exclusive brands 
Tractor Supply's exclusive brands include:

 4health
 Red Shed
 CountyLine
 Retriever
 Ridgecut
 Blue Mountain
 American Farm Works
 Barn Star
 Bit & Bridle
 C.E. Schmidt Workwear 
 Red Stone
 Producer's Pride
 Job Smart
 Paws & Claws
 Traveller 
 Treeline
 Pet Vet Clinic 
 Tractor Supply Co Rx

Operation

Marketing 
Tractor Supply's mission statement is: "To work hard, have fun and make money by providing legendary service and great products at everyday low prices." In the mid-2000s, Tractor Supply conducted advertising campaigns featuring the slogan "The Stuff You Need Out Here." The company's tagline later became “For Life Out Here.”

From 1998 to 2002, George Strait was the spokesman for Tractor Supply.

In 2020, Tractor Supply was a sponsor of the NBA. In 2021, the company became a corporate sponsor of PBR.

Distribution centers 
Tractor Supply has eight distribution centers:
Waverly, Nebraska
Pendleton, Indiana
Casa Grande, Arizona
Waco, Texas
Franklin, Kentucky
Frankfort, New York
Hagerstown, Maryland
Macon, Georgia

In 2021, the company broke ground on its ninth distribution center which will be located in Navarre, Ohio.

Corporate affairs

Philanthropy 
The company has been a sponsor for 4-H since 2010. In the fall of 2021, Tractor Supply raised $1.3 million for 4-H members through their Paper Clover campaign. In 2016, the company started its Grants for Growing program to raise money for FFA students. In 2021, the company raised $790,269.

In 2019, Tractor Supply started working with the MuttNation Foundation, a nonprofit founded by Miranda Lambert that helps shelter pets. The foundation is supported by proceeds from MuttNation's line of pet products sold by Tractor Supply.

In 2020, Tractor Supply joined Land O'Lakes, Microsoft and others in the American Connection Project to support rural broadband access.

Environmental initiatives 
In 2017, all TSC stores were outfitted with LED lighting. In 2021, the company was named to Investor Business Daily's 100 Best ESG Companies. In December 2021, the company joined the U.S. Environmental Protection Agency’s Green Power Partnership. TSC has committed to net zero carbon emissions by 2040.

Acquisitions and subsidiaries
In 2002, Tractor Supply was part of a group (also including four liquidation firms) that purchased some of the leases of the bankrupt Quality Stores, Inc., a Michigan-based company. The company operated over 300 stores in 30 states under the names CT Farm & Country; Country General; Quality Farm & Fleet; County Post; Central Farm and Fleet, and FISCO. In September 2016, Tractor Supply acquired Petsense, LLC, a small-box specialty retailer of pet supplies primarily located in small and mid-size communities. In February 2021, the company announced that it would acquire Orscheln Farm & Home for $297 million.

Tractor Supply also owns Del's Feed & Farm Supply, a former farm retail chain in the Pacific Northwest and Hawaii, with all but two Del's stores having been converted into Tractor Supply stores.

Maternity litigation
A lawsuit filed against the company by former employee Melissa Douglas claims the company violated the Americans with Disabilities Act when it refused to offer her modified work duties while she was pregnant.

TSC Stores L.P. (Canada) 

In November 1966, TSC opened its first Canadian location in London, Ontario. The Canadian stores have not been affiliated with the U.S. operation of TSC since 1987,  when the American parent company sold these locations to Birch Hill Equity Partner., an investment company based in Toronto. In July 2016, Peavey Mart acquired a controlling stake in TSC, and later acquired the company outright. In 2016, the Manitoba TSC stores were rebranded as Peavey Mart, while Ontario stores were rebranded by February 2021.

References

Further reading

External links

 

Farm and ranch supply stores of the United States
Retail companies established in 1938
Companies based in Tennessee
Williamson County, Tennessee
Home improvement retailers of the United States
Companies listed on the Nasdaq
1938 establishments in North Dakota
1994 initial public offerings
Agriculture companies established in 1938
American companies established in 1938
Hardware stores of the United States
Agricultural supply stores
Pet stores